Portrait of the Fighter as a Young Man is a 2010 Romanian drama film directed by Constantin Popescu Jr. It was released at the 60th Berlin International Film Festival.

Plot
The film is the first part of a trilogy which describes the fight of the Romanian anticommunist resistance in the 50s. This first movie is centered on the figure of Ion Gavrilă Ogoranu, a member of the fascist and anti-Semitic Iron Guard, played by Constantin Diță.

In April 2010, the movie received the Public Award and the Image Award (Liviu Marghidan) at B-EST Film Festival in Bucharest.

The film was released in Romania on 18 November 2010.

Cast
 Constantin Diță
 Alexandru Potocean
 Răzvan Vasilescu 
 Mimi Brănescu
 Teodor Corban
 Mihai Constantin
 Bogdan Dumitrache
 Mimi Brănescu
 Dan Bordeieanu
 Cătălin Babliuc
 Constantin Lupescu
 Nicodim Ungureanu
 Ingrid Bisu
 Alin Mihalache
 Radu Iacoban

References

External links
 

Romanian drama films